Film1 Action is a Dutch premium television channel owned by SPI International. Its main focus is on thriller, action and horror films. Film1 launched together with its sister service Sport1 on 1 February 2006 and replaced the Canal+ Netherlands television channels. Film1 offers multiple channels with Dutch and international film and television series productions. On 1 October 2008 Film1 launched Film1 Action.

The channel is available on most digital cable and IPTV providers, and satellite provider CanalDigitaal. DVB-T provider Digitenne does not provide Film1.

See also
 Film1
 Television in the Netherlands
 Digital television in the Netherlands

External links
 film1.nl 
 alleenopeen.tv

References

Television channels in the Netherlands
SPI International
Television channels and stations established in 2008
Mass media in Amsterdam